Richard Merjan (born 10 November 1988) is a Lebanese-Australian slalom canoeist. 

Merjan took up canoeing in 2001 at Ivanhoe Grammar School in Melbourne, Australia, and in 2003 started training with the Australian national team. He holds a dual Australian-Lebanese citizenship, and since 2009 competes for Lebanon. He missed qualifications for the 2012 Olympics due to a bad cut to his hand sustained in 2011. In 2016, he became the first Lebanese slalom canoeist to compete at Olympics. He finished last in the C-1 event. 

Merjan has a degree in commerce, finance and language studies from the Deakin University in Victoria, Australia. He works as a flight analyst for an Australian airline.

References 

1988 births
Living people
Lebanese male canoeists
Canoeists at the 2016 Summer Olympics
Olympic canoeists of Lebanon
 Canoeists at the 2010 Asian Games
Canoeists at the 2014 Asian Games
Asian Games competitors for Lebanon
Deakin University alumni
People educated at Ivanhoe Grammar School